Fairtrade bananas was a marketing initiative which focused on increasing the price paid to small banana growers and the wages of agricultural workers. This is not a commercial brand, but a marketing strategy.  Fair trade is based on higher prices paid by consumers that allow an equitable distribution of gains from trade over the chain partners.

There are many of organizations involved in producing fair trade bananas; for example, an organization called Banafair began importing uncertified/unlabeled fair trade bananas into Germany in the mid-1980s (from 500 to 1 000 tonnes annually). In 1997 Fair Trade Labeling Organizations International (FLO) was established in Bonn, Germany to consolidate various labeling initiatives and establish worldwide standards for fair trade bananas. The first fair trade labelled bananas imported to Germany were by TransFair in April 1998.

Fair Trade Labeling Organizations International, (now renamed Fair Trade International), is a large importer whose bananas bear the International FairTrade Certification Mark. FLO-CERT is the international body that inspects the farms to ensure they meet the proper social and environmental according to Fair Trade international standards.

Global banana industry
Five companies control about 80% of the conventional banana trade.  This situation, plus the intervention of various governments, has kept the price paid to banana growers and wages to workers a small percentage of the supermarket price.  Examples of this effect are the banana wars; the formation of the United Fruit Company (now Chiquita Brands Intl.); the Bananagate bribery scandal; military coups to establish and maintain banana republics.  There is ongoing industry conflict with unions. In Colombia, banana companies have been known to get involved with paramilitaries that kill human rights activists and confrontations with labor unions. (see Paramilitarism in Colombia for more information.)

Fair trade certification 

FLO has different standards for small banana farms and larger banana plantations. To be eligible to display a Fair Trade Certification Mark, small farmers must create a panel of both workers and management to determine the best use of the fair trade premiums.  Revenues to banana farmers must be equally shared between the working members of the cooperative or association.

On larger plantations, the premiums can only be used for improving working and living conditions. Forced labor and labor of children under 16 years of age is prohibited, as is dangerous work.  Young adults 16 years of age or older must not work so many hours that they have no time for education. Workers must be allowed to join a union, and be paid at least regional industry average or minimum wage.

Although fair trade banana workers’ wages are not significantly above industry averages, they receive wage related benefits which increase their overall livelihood. However, many small banana farmers barely make living wages themselves, and the restriction of premiums to community development projects may prevent them from covering basic living expenses.

Fair trade price and premium 

Monetary premiums are paid for fair trade banana growers to improve their communities. In 2013, FairTrade Certified banana producers receive a FairTrade Minimum Premium of $1 US dollar per 18.14 kilogram box of bananas to invest in community projects.  FairTrade farmers are guaranteed a minimum price to help cover the costs of sustainable production, but the price differs between regions and is subject to market fluctuations in the sustainable cost of agricultural production. Although FairTrade minimum prices vary, FairTrade Minimum premiums do not. Both FairTrade prices and premiums are set at the same level for FairTrade certified plantations and small farms.

Environmental impacts 

The agricultural production of bananas on a large scale often uses more pesticides (and fungicides, fertilizers) than any other fresh fruit commodity. Fair Trade banana production promotes sustainable farming practices, but these result in a higher supermarket price which some consumers are willing to pay for ethical reasons.

Research and discussion
Because the banana trade is a large world-wide business, a number of studies have been carried out on various aspects of the fair trade banana market, including political ecology, tariffs and quotas, price competition, organic growing, and retail price wars.

Fair trade certification programs have been criticized on several grounds. Griffiths has challenged the ethics of fair trade labels in the fair trade debate, and, in the Journal of Business Ethics, has pointed out instances in which negative research is not published and academics  choose only successful coops or fair trade organizations for study.   In the Dominican Republic, Shreck found minimum pricing, and exclusivity of certification worsened socioeconomic disparity within farming communities, and limited access for non-certified farmers to the market. Furthermore, Shrek found that the standards of certification programs prioritized market interests over farmer rights and well-being.  Frank has argued that fair trade initiatives do not generally foster an empowering partnership between consumers and farmers.

Foncho campaign
The Fairtrade Foundation campaign 2014-2016 used Foncho (full name Albeiro Alfonso ‘Foncho’ Cantillo) a farmer from Cienaga, Colombia, and member of a Fairtrade-certified co-operative called Coobafiro as the face for a year long video campaign for schools, starting with a visit to the UK to appear at Fairtrade Fortnight.

See also
Fair trade

References 

http://www.healthmenia.com/health-benefits-of-banana/

External links
 http://www.bananalink.org.uk/
 http://www.fairtrade.org.uk/en/buying-fairtrade/bananas
 http://www.healthmenia.com/health-benefits-of-banana/

Bananas
Fair trade